Aiyanna Brigitte Stiverne (born 20 February 1995) is a Canadian sprinter. She competed in the women's 400 metres at the 2017 World Championships in Athletics.

Aiyanna is the cousin of former WBC heavyweight world champion Bermane Stiverne.

References

External links

 Aiyanna Brigitte Stiverne at the 2019 Pan American Games

1995 births
Living people
Canadian female sprinters
World Athletics Championships athletes for Canada
Place of birth missing (living people)
Athletes (track and field) at the 2019 Pan American Games
Pan American Games track and field athletes for Canada
Pan American Games silver medalists for Canada
Pan American Games medalists in athletics (track and field)
Medalists at the 2019 Pan American Games
20th-century Canadian women
21st-century Canadian women
Commonwealth Games gold medallists for Canada
Commonwealth Games medallists in athletics
Athletes (track and field) at the 2022 Commonwealth Games
Medallists at the 2022 Commonwealth Games